The Tussler – Original Motion Picture Soundtrack is the first album by Motorpsycho & Friends, released in 1994. The album was the soundtrack to a fictional Spaghetti Western by non-existent director Theo Buhara. Its Country Rock sound marked a drastic departure from the earlier Motorpsycho records, which were hard-rocking.

Originally released only on CD in 1994 in two very limited editions, it was re-released in 1996 as a double 10" vinyl, after the band, now calling themselves The International Tussler Society, got together again to record some new material in (supposedly) late summer 1995. From these sessions, four songs were included as bonus tracks on the vinyl reissue.

After a long hiatus, the I.T.S. regrouped in 2002 to play some gigs and decided to remaster the original album, which had become a sought-after rarity in the Motorpsycho catalogue. It was finally released in 2003 in its definitive form including all songs from the 1995 sessions.

Track listing

Original CD edition (1994)
"Theme From The Tussler"  – 1:40
"Six Days On The Road"  – 2:59
"Frances"  – 2:14
"Babylon"  – 3:53
"I Know You Rider"  – 3:56
"Hogwash"  – 3:02
"The Tussler" (slight return)  – 0:26
"Sunnyboy Gaybar"  – 1:37
"Sunchild"  – 5:28
"Waiting for the One"  – 3:04
"A Memory"  – 5:04

2 x 10" vinyl edition (1996)
Side A:
Theme From The Tussler  – 1:40
Six Days On The Road  – 2:59
Frances  – 2:14
Babylon  – 3:53
Side B:
I Know You Rider  – 3:56
Hogwash  – 3:02
The Tussler (slight return)  – 0:26
Sunchild  – 5:28
Side C:
Sonnyboy Gaybar  – 1:37
Waiting For The One  – 3:04
A Memory  – 5:04
Side D:
Polka with the Devil  – 3:50
Lazy Days  – 2:45
Changes  – 2:59
Albuquerque  – 4:26

Remastered CD edition (2003)
Theme From The Tussler  – 1:40 (Gebhardt)
Six Days on the Road  – 2:59 (Greene/Montgomery)
Frances  – 2:14 (Ryan/Sæther)
Babylon  – 3:53 (Sæther)
I Know You Rider  – 3:56 (traditional arrangement)
Hogwash  – 3:02 (Sæther)
The Tussler (slight return)  – 0:26 (Gebhardt)
Sunnyboy Gaybar  – 1:37 (Sæther/Ryan/Gebhardt/Lien)
Sunchild  – 5:28 (Sæther)
Waiting for the One  – 3:04 (Sæther)
A Memory  – 5:04 (Ryan/Sæther)
Polka with the Devil  – 3:50 (Gebhardt/Sæther)
Lazy Days  – 2:45 (Parsons)
Changes  – 2:59 (Karlsen)
Albuquerque  – 4:26 (Young)
Bird Song  – 8:56 (Hunter/Garcia)
One More Saturday Night  – 4:18 (Weir)
With Care From Someone  – 3:41 (Clark/Dillard/Leadon)
Queen Chinee  – 2:28 (Ryan/Sæther)
Illinois  – 6:52 (Sæther/Ryan/Burt)
It Must Have Been The Roses  – 5:34 (Hunter/Garcia)

Remastered 2 x 12" vinyl edition (2003)
Side A: 
Theme From The Tussler  – 1:40 (Gebhardt)
Six Days On The Road  – 2:59 (Greene/Montgomery)
Frances  – 2:14 (Ryan/Sæther)
Babylon  – 3:53 (Sæther)
I Know You Rider  – 3:56 (traditional arrangement)
Hogwash  – 3:02 (Sæther)
The Tussler (slight return)  – 0:26 (Gebhardt)
Sunnyboy Gaybar  – 1:37 (Sæther/Ryan/Gebhardt/Lien)
Side B:
Sunchild  – 5:28 (Sæther)
Waiting for the One  – 3:04 (Sæther)
A Memory  – 5:04 (Ryan/Sæther)
Polka with the Devil  – 3:50 (Gebhardt/Sæther)
Lazy Days  – 2:45 (Parsons)
Side C:
Changes  – 2:59 (Karlsen)
Albuquerque  – 4:26 (Young)
Bird Song  – 8:56 (Hunter/Garcia)
One More Saturday Night  – 4:18 (Weir)
Side D:
With Care From Someone  – 3:41 (Clark/Dillard/Leadon)
Queen Chinee  – 2:28 (Ryan/Sæther)
Illinois  – 6:52 (Sæther/Ryan/Burt)
It Must Have Been The Roses  – 5:34 (Hunter/Garcia)

Personnel
Barry "Space" Hillien (Lars Lien): lead vocals (2,3,4,6,9,10,11,13,16,20,21), keyboards, bass
Kjell "K.K." Karlsen: pedal steel guitar, lead vocals (14)
Duellin' Flint Gebhardt (Håkon Gebhardt): banjo, electric & acoustic guitar
Chickenshakin' Lolly Hanks Jr. (Morten Fagervik): drums, vocals, harmonica, percussion
Snakebite Ryan (Hans Magnus Ryan): electric & acoustic guitars, violin, mandolin, recorder, vocals
Charlie Bob Bent (Bent Sæther): lead vocals (5,8,12,15,17-19), bass, acoustic & electric guitars, mandolin

with:
Chris (a local (female) hairdresser): second lead vocal (9)

Motorpsycho albums
1994 albums